Zarah Fairn dos Santos (born December 10, 1986) is a French female mixed martial artist who competes in the Bantamweight and Featherweight divisions of the Ultimate Fighting Championship. She reached a career-best ranking of #7 at Women’s Featherweight on Fight Matrix on July 1, 2018.

Mixed martial arts career

Early career

Fairn faced future Bellator title challenger Sinead Kavanagh at BAMMA 24: Ireland vs. England on February 26, 2016. She lost the close bout via split decision.

Ultimate Fighting Championship

Santos faced Megan Anderson on October 6, 2019, at UFC 243. She lost the fight by first-round submission.

Santos faced Felicia Spencer on February 29, 2020, at UFC Fight Night 169. She lost by first-round TKO.

Santos was scheduled to face Josiane Nunes on April 17, 2021, at UFC on ESPN: Whittaker vs. Gastelum. Fairn weighed in at 147 pounds, eight pounds over the 139-pound catchweight limit. (The bantamweight fight was moved to a catchweight prior to the start of the weigh-ins.) The bout against Nunes was canceled due to the weight discrepancy after Nunes weighed in at 136 pounds.

Santos was scheduled to face Joselyne Edwards on August 28, 2021, at UFC on ESPN: Barboza vs. Chikadze, but the fight was canceled in late July when Edwards was removed from the event for another bout.

Santos was scheduled to face Ailin Perez on September 3, 2022, at UFC Fight Night 209,  but was pulled from the event and replaced by Stephanie Egger.

The match between Santos and Nunes was rescheduled for January 21, 2023, at UFC 283. She lost the fight via unanimous decision.

Championships and accomplishments
Cage Warriors Academy South East
CWSE Bantamweight Championship (One time)

Mixed martial arts record

|-
|Loss
|align=center|6–5
|Josiane Nunes
|Decision (unanimous)
|UFC 283
|
|align=center|3
|align=center|5:00
|Rio de Janeiro, Brazil
|
|-
|Loss
|align=center|6–4
|Felicia Spencer
|TKO (punches and elbows)
|UFC Fight Night: Benavidez vs. Figueiredo 
|
|align=center|1
|align=center|3:37
|Norfolk, Virginia, United States
|
|-
|Loss
|align=center|6–3
|Megan Anderson
|Submission (triangle choke)
|UFC 243 
|
|align=center|1
|align=center|3:57
|Melbourne, Australia
|
|-
|Win
|align=center| 6–2
|Izabela Badurek
|TKO (punches)
|Ladies Fight Night 7
|
|align=center| 1
|align=center| 1:55
|Łódź, Poland
|
|-
|Win
|align=center| 5–2
|Suvi Salmimies
|Decision (unanimous)
|Cage 40
|
|align=center| 3
|align=center| 5:00
|Helsinki, Finland
|
|-
|Win
|align=center|4–2
|Kerry Hughes
|TKO (punches)
|British Challenge MMA 18
|
|align=center|1
|align=center|2:53
|Colchester, England
|
|-
|Loss
|align=center|3–2
|Sinead Kavanagh
|Decision (split)
|BAMMA 24: Kone Vs. Phillips
|
|align=center|3
|align=center|5:00
|Dublin, Ireland
|
|-
|Win
|align=center| 3–1
|Liubov Belyakova
|TKO (punches)
|W.I.N. Fighting Championship
|
|align=center|1
|align=center|N/A
|Shenzhen, China
|
|-
|Win
|align=center|2–1
|Marion Nicolai
|Decision (unanimous)
| Gladiator Fighting Arena 2
|
| align=center|2
| align=center|5:00
|Nîmes, France
|
|-
|Loss
|align=center| 1–1
|Elina Nilsson
|Decision (unanimous)
|The Zone FC 12
|
| align=center|3
| align=center|5:00
|Gothenburg, Sweden
|
|-
|Win
|align=center|1–0
|Helin Paara
|TKO (corner stoppage)
|MMA Raju 11
|
|align=center|1
|align=center|4:00
|Tallinn, Estonia
|

See also 
 List of current UFC fighters
 List of female mixed martial artists

References

External links 
  
  

1986 births
Living people
French female mixed martial artists
Bantamweight mixed martial artists
Featherweight mixed martial artists
Ultimate Fighting Championship female fighters
Sportspeople from Paris